"Fast Cars and Freedom" is a song recorded by American country music group Rascal Flatts.  It was released in March 2005 as the third single from the album Feels Like Today.  It was the group's fourth Number One single on the U.S. Billboard Hot Country Songs charts.

The single was co-written by Rascal Flatts' lead singer Gary LeVox, along with Wendell Mobley and Neil Thrasher. Previously, the three writers had also written Rascal Flatts' 2003 single "I Melt".

Chart performance
"Fast Cars and Freedom" debuted at number 56 on the U.S. Billboard Hot Country Songs for the week of March 26, 2005.

Year-end charts

References

2005 singles
Rascal Flatts songs
Songs written by Neil Thrasher
Lyric Street Records singles
Song recordings produced by Mark Bright (record producer)
Songs written by Wendell Mobley
Songs written by Gary LeVox
2004 songs